Dragone may refer to:

 Dragone (company), a Belgian creative company
 Dragone (river), a river of the Amalfi Coast, Italy

People with the surname
 Franco Dragone (born 1952), Italian theatre director
 Giuseppe Cavo Dragone (born 1957), Italian naval officer
 Maureen Dragone (1920–2013), American journalist

See also
 Dragon (disambiguation)
 Dragoni (disambiguation)